Dale  Purinton (born October 11, 1976) is an American former professional ice hockey defenseman, known as an enforcer, who played 181 games for the New York Rangers in the National Hockey League.

Playing career
Purinton was drafted in the 5th round, 117th overall, by the New York Rangers in the 1995 NHL Entry Draft. He spent the early part of his career in the WHL, ECHL, and AHL before his NHL debut in the 1999–2000 season.

In 181 NHL games Purinton racked up 578 penalty minutes to go with his 4 goals and 16 assists. After completing the 2007–08 season with the Lake Erie Monsters of the American Hockey League, he became an unrestricted free agent and upon failing to sign with a new team, subsequently retired.

Coaching career
Purinton was hired as head coach of the Cowichan Valley Capitals of the BCHL on October 18, 2009. He was later hired as head coach of the Kerry Park Islanders of the VIJHL.

Personal life
Purinton was born in Fort Wayne, Indiana, but his family moved to Sicamous, British Columbia when he was four years old.

On August 11, 2015, Purinton was arrested in Oneida County, New York on charges of burglary.

Career statistics

Suspensions
This is a list of suspensions that he has received:
 April 8, 2008,
The AHL suspended Purinton three games for his actions during an April 4 game in Hamilton.
 March 27, 2008,
The AHL suspended Purinton three games for his actions during a game on March 26. The three-game suspension was automatic after Purinton received his fifth game misconduct in the general category this season.
 March 20, 2008,
The AHL suspended Purinton one game for his actions during pre-game warms ups prior to an AHL game against Grand Rapids.
 March 15, 2008,
The AHL suspended Purinton for 2 games for accumulating 4 misconducts in one season. His latest came in the first period of a game against the Grand Rapids Griffins in which he kneed right winger Jamie Tardif.
 February 19, 2008,
The AHL suspended Purinton for four games for his actions in a game against Hamilton.
 October 19, 2007,
The AHL suspended Purinton for 25 games for punching Stars' forward Marius Holtet in the head from behind with a gloved fist after the completion of play during a game between Lake Erie and Iowa.
 April 26, 2006
The AHL suspended him for 1 game for instigation a fight during the last 5 minutes of a game.
 October 1, 2005
On October 4 the NHL handed out a 10-game suspension for an attempt to eye-gouge Colton Orr in a pre-season game.
 2004–05 season in the ECHL
suspended by the ECHL on December 10 for 6 games for elbowing a player into the head during the game vs Bakersfield on December 7.
Later in the season the ECHL suspended him for 3 games for his refusal to stop fighting and pulling the hair of a player. As a result, the Salmon Kings released him. He only played 25 games that season and racked up 192 penalty minutes.
 February 2002
The NHL handed out a 3-game suspension for a sucker-punch to Jason Blake of the New York Islanders.
 October 2001
The NHL handed out a 7-game suspension for a cross-check to the head of Stephen Peat of the Washington Capitals.
 September 2001
The NHL handed out a 4-game suspension for beating up goaltender Garth Snow in an NHL pre-season game.
 1999
Purinton suspended by the AHL for 3 games during the 1998–1999 season.

See also
 Violence in ice hockey
 Fighting in ice hockey

References

External links
 

1976 births
Living people
American men's ice hockey defensemen
Charlotte Checkers (1993–2010) players
Kelowna Rockets players
Hartford Wolf Pack players
Ice hockey players from Indiana
Lake Erie Monsters players
Lethbridge Hurricanes players
Moose Jaw Warriors players
New York Rangers draft picks
New York Rangers players
Sportspeople from Fort Wayne, Indiana
Tacoma Rockets players
Victoria Salmon Kings players
Vernon Lakers players